Yaşamak Ne Güzel Şey is a 1969 Turkish musical comedy film directed by Halit Refiğ and starring Öztürk Serengil, Selda Alkor, and Engin Çaglar.

References

External links
Yaşamak Ne Güzel Şey at the Internet Movie Database

1969 films
Turkish musical comedy films
1969 musical comedy films
Films directed by Halit Refiğ